Riverview Hospital was a Canadian mental health facility located in Coquitlam, British Columbia. It operated under the governance of BC Mental Health & Addiction Services until it closed, in July 2012. In December 2015, the provincial government announced plans to replace the obsolete buildings with new mental health facilities, scheduled to open in about 2019. As of 2019, several unsafe buildings have been torn down, but no new construction has started.

At one time, Riverview Hospital was known as Essondale Hospital, for Henry Esson Young (1862–1939), who played an important role in establishing the facility. The neighbourhood where the hospital is located also became known as the Essondale neighbourhood.

History
In 1876, Royal Hospital in Victoria was converted to British Columbia's first facility to house mentally ill patients. Due to crowding, Royal Hospital was closed and the patients moved to the new Provincial Asylum for the Insane in 1878. Again facing problems of overcrowding at the turn of the century, in 1904, the provincial government purchased  in then-rural Coquitlam for the construction of Riverview Hospital and the adjacent Colony Farm lands. Construction of a temporary "Hospital for the Mind" began at the Riverview property in 1909.

In 1911, British Columbia's first Provincial Botanist, John Davidson, established an arboretum, a nursery, and a botanical garden on the hospital lands, often with the assistance of patients, as there existed a belief in the therapeutic value of this kind of work. The botanical garden was moved to the new University of British Columbia in 1916, but the arboretum and nursery remained.

In 1913, a permanent provincial mental hospital, administered by Henry Esson Young, was opened, treating about 300 seriously mentally ill male patients. The building was originally constructed to hold 480 patients, but by the end of the year, it housed 919. By this time, Colony Farm was producing over 700 tons of crops and 20,000 gallons of milk in a year, using mostly patient labour. In 1950, the Male Chronic building was renamed West Lawn, the Female Chronic building East Lawn, and the Acute Psychopathic Unit became Centre Lawn. The hospital itself was then called the Provincial Mental Hospital, Essondale. In 1983, the West Lawn building was closed. In 1984, 141 acres of Riverview's upper hillside were sold, subdivided, and developed as the Riverview Heights subdivision, with 250 single-family homes, and the remaining Riverview forest was acquired by the city of Coquitlam.

In 1924, the Acute Psychopathic Unit, later called Centre Lawn, opened. Several hospital staff lived at the remote site, and by 1927, this had grown into a small community called Essondale, which included shops, a school, and a fire hall.

In 1930, the 675-bed Female Chronic Unit (later called East Lawn) opened due to overcrowding. The first phase of what would eventually be called the Crease Clinic, the Veteran's Unit, opened in 1934, with the second phase opening in 1949, giving Riverview its most iconic building. Finally in 1955, the Tuberculosis Unit (later called North Lawn) opened, marking the peak of patient residence.

By 1956, the hospital had reached 4,306 patients. In 1959, the charge of mental health services was transferred from the provincial secretary to the newly formed Department of Health Services. The transfer was followed by a transition from custodial care to the more active psychiatric care of patients. In 1967, Davidson resigned as deputy minister and was replaced by F.G. Tucker, a resident physician of Essondale (Riverview) from 1953 who, in 1959, became the clinical director of the Crease Clinic.

A steady decline in beds and facilities started in the 1960s and continued up to 2004, at which point there were only 800 beds. Some say that the reason for this decrease was initially due to the introduction of anti-psychotic medications and the development of psychiatric units in acute-care hospitals as well as a move toward outpatient care. As early as 1967, a decision had been made to downsize Riverview Hospital. The determination was first brought up officially on paper three years after the publication of the Mental Health Act of 1964, which intended to have mental health care be as readily available to the population as that of physical health. The two acts worked in conjunction so that by 1970, there were seventeen mental health centres in British Columbia, twelve of which had opened within the previous four years.

Decreases continued. In 1969, the provincial government appointed a committee to review the role of the Mental Health Branch of social services in British Columbia. The committee decided to further downsize Riverview in a stated plan to implement other community care centres. As further closures were being planned, legislation was also passed in 1969 that deemed Riverview an "open hospital" allowing private practitioners to send their patients to Riverview. A shift away from directors trained in psychiatry to administrative ones was marked. As services and beds at Riverview continuously decreased, while opening access to it through private practice, another official plan to entirely close Riverview Hospital was written in 1987: A Draft Plan to Replace Riverview Hospital.

Regional clinics began drawing patients from Riverview, and both advances in treatment and eventual cutbacks in funding resulted in fewer people receiving mental health care province-wide. In 1983, West Lawn closed, and farming operations at Colony Farm were discontinued. In 1984, the provincial government sold  of Riverview lands to Molnar Developments. Shortly afterward, this land was subdivided and became Riverview Heights, with about 250 single-family homes. In 1985, an acute geriatric unit was opened at Riverview Hospital.

In 1988, management of the hospital was officially transferred from the directors to a board of provincially appointed trustees. The shift was an anticipated one, as the Report of the Mental Health Planning Survey of 1979 states: "What began as the sensible idea of using non-medical, trained administrators for administrative tasks, has subtly become the use of untrained non-medical administrators, and a simultaneous denial of the psychiatrist's role in clinical leadership." The shift had been happening from the early 1960s and has been argued to be one of the reasons for the 1969 committee's decision to downsize Riverview and decrease funding. The board, as far less experienced in psychiatry than the original managers, who held doctorates and who were trained psychiatrists, were again replaced in 1992 by another board without trustees that was said to give a broader representation of concerns, including those of consumers patients, businesses, and union and community agencies.

By 1990, the decision had officially been made to reduce Riverview to a 358-bed facility, with the presumed intention of opening regional-care facilities throughout the province as stated in the Mental Health Initiative.

In 1992, the report Listening: A Review of Riverview Hospital was published as an attempt to resolve the complaints of patients and their family members that had gone ignored for years. The document "emphasizes that a full assessment of patients' decision-making abilities and personal support network is necessary, and that a patient be notified and given an opportunity to object before an incapability certificate is completed." The new rights of patients were implemented less than a decade before the hospital was entirely shut down. Also in 1992, the Crease Clinic closed.

Also in 1992, the Riverview Horticultural Centre Society was formed to preserve the remnants of the botanical garden and to advocate for John Davidson's vision of psychological therapy through horticulture.

By the year 2002, there were 800 beds in all of Riverview. In 2004, it was stated that by 2007, 400 new beds would open in other areas of British Columbia for mental health services, but places and dates went unmentioned. Neither did the report state how many beds would be removed from Riverview. In 2005, the East Lawn building closed, followed by the North Lawn building in 2007, and in 2012, the last patients were moved from Centre Lawn, and Riverview Hospital closed.

Other buildings on Riverview Hospital grounds continued as mental health facilities. In 2005, the city's task force on the hospital lands rejected the idea of further housing on the lands and declared that the lands and buildings should be protected and remain as a mental health facility. In 2009, Riverview Hospital was added to the Canadian Register of Historic Places.

Other mental health facilities have been constructed on the Riverview grounds, the first being Connolly Lodge, which opened on March 1, 2002; Cottonwood Lodge opened a few years later, and Cypress Lodge on April 23, 2010. Together, these three lodges have beds for 64 patients. In addition, twelve cottages are still in use as transitional housing for patients from the Forensic Hospital, and the Brookside and Hillside buildings host a 35-bed residential rehabilitation and recovery program run by Coast Mental Health for patients with concurrent disorders.

The construction of a provincially funded $101-million mental health and addiction treatment facility on the Riverview grounds, named Red Fish Healing Centre for Mental Health and Addiction, began in 2017 and was planned to open its doors in 2021. It is intended to provide inpatient care for 105 patients. The focus of its programs were developed to deliver specialized care for adults with severe and complex mental health and addiction challenges.

Units before closure

Industrial Therapy Building
The Industrial Therapy Building was implemented in 1963, with a total cost of $505,000. Patients were assigned for instruction and training in a selected shop, which included cabinet, upholstery, furniture finishing, metal, printing, electronics, machine, mattresses, tailor, and shoemaking. It was said that the program was of use to the patients, as they would need vocations when they were to resume life in the community. The shops were supposed to give them skills to work once discharged from the hospital.

Acute Geriatric Psychiatric Division
The Geriatric Psychiatry Division of Riverview Hospital was opened in 1985. A 26-bed acute (temporary) admissions unit was opened. The division was intended to be the first stage of a larger implementation of geriatric services in psychiatry across British Columbia. The program focused on social interaction and fast movement into the community and social situations.

Film industry
The vacant structures that used to form the hospital are now often used as filming locations. Shows and films such as Watchmen, Supernatural, The X Files, Arrow, Elf, Smallville, Happy Gilmore, Prison Break, Riverdale, Motherland: Fort Salem, The Butterfly Effect, Final Destination 2, and Grave Encounters have made use of the Riverview property to form sets depicting a variety of scenes. A significant portion of Deadpool 2, including the initial and final battle sequences, was filmed at Centre Lawn.

Publications

Riverview Reminisces
Riverview Reminisces is a collection of stories and anecdotes from the staff of Riverview Hospital. The stories span the first years of Riverview's existence to its last years, prior to closure. It was published in 1992.

Mental Health Consultation Report: A Draft Plan to Replace Riverview Hospital
A Draft Plan to Replace Riverview Hospital is a 1987 report that demonstrates the reasoning for closing Riverview Hospital, the intended community implementations of psychiatric services, and the necessary transitional procedures (the majority of which were never seen).

The report states: "Implementation will involve redeveloping and reallocating existing resources applied at Riverview Hospital" (21). Riverview was to be reduced to a 550-medium/long-term patient capacity from its then-1,306, with the resources being reallocated "elsewhere in the community" (ibid).

The process was said to constitute the following: 218 staff FTEs for case management/outpatient treatment duties, resulting in 4,360 additional units of care being available to the mental health system; 1,090 additional patient places for community support lrograms (i.e., social/recreational and life skills/vocational); 310 additional residential care beds for mental health care, divided between intermediate and special adult residential treatment facilities; 60 psychiatric acute care beds to be added to the general hospital system (ibid).

Implementation was suggested to be a two-stage process. The first stage was to include the development of community residential, day program, and case management/outpatient treatment resources around the province to reduce Riverview patient population to 550 over three years. Additional beds in general hospitals and testing of medium/long-term inpatient units in urban areas were suggested to fall under the first stage. Further implementation of the medium/long-term care units was to take place following the three years so as to conjoin with the anticipated closure of Riverview five years from that date (ibid).

An orderly transitional period was deemed necessary for patients to be relocated to appropriate community settings with 'sufficient mental health staff and programs to monitor, follow-up, and promote their readjustment outside the institution" (22).

The report emphasizes that implementation of the plan should be gradual and orderly, with continuous monitoring to assure the system meets the needs of the mentally ill. It also repeats that there should be careful assessment and supervision of patients being transferred from Riverview Hospital—that any transfers should be based on clinical assessment and that proper discussion with family members must take place (ibid).

Home and family care were strongly recommended in the report for geriatric patients.

In the sections titled "Summary of Recommendations", the first two recommendations enforce the role of the families to take care of patients. The third emphasizes the role of volunteer programs to help the mentally ill. The primary-care physician (GP) was also suggested to become the main person to treat mental illness. Suggestion 14 states that general community services should play an important role in aiding those with mental illness. Recommendation 25 also enforces the role of general practitioners and community psychiatrists (30).

As can be seen by the stated recommendations, extra finances were hoped to be avoided in the change. As well, the overall amount of finances given by the provincial government to psychiatric care was expected to decrease, which is apparent in the report. Be that as it may, recommendations still distinctly state that "The current level of financial resources at Riverview Hospital should be available for treatment, rehabilitation, and support of the mentally ill people transferred to community-based facilities and programs" (22).

Despite financial cuts, many of the recommendations enforce sufficient beds for the acutely mentally ill, proper assessment and supervision, and sufficient education for the new carers to be offered as psychiatric care changes. Even more importantly, recommendations 63 and 64 state that all programs must be in place prior to any reductions or adjustments to Riverview, and that bridge funding between the psychiatric hospital and community programs must be available (32). The report, although subtly recommending a decrease in governmental financial aid for psychiatric services, repeatedly states that sufficient funding and proper care in transfers, including previously implemented community resources and supervision by Riverview before and after discharge, are crucial.

BC Housing: A Vision for Renewing Riverview
In 2015, BC Housing published "A Vision for Renewing Riverview", an initiative for developing the Riverview lands into a provincially administered municipality including housing for the mentally ill and for Indigenous housing. As of 2019, the BC government has not acted upon this initiative.

Impact of closure
The 1990 "Mental Health Initiative" stated that the provincial government would invest $26 million in additional funding over the following ten years. But only the first payment was initiated, and in 1992, the second payment was eighteen months overdue.

In 1992, about 8,000 of the yearly emergency admissions to Vancouver's mental health facilities were people with both drug addictions and mental illnesses. The reason is stated that "Port Coquitlam's Riverview Hospital is being emptied, and the sick are being thrown to the coyotes".

Joseph Noone, the clinical director psychiatrist-in-chief at Riverview in 1992, claimed that A Draft Plan to Replace Riverview Hospital had "magical faith that the Social Credit government would follow through on its promises to expand services in the community once they had downsized this hospital". Noone claims that he was suspicious of the report since its publication. Noone also stated that 1,000 patients were brought in and shipped out of Riverview annually.

The Greater Vancouver Mental Health Services had only 115 full-time workers, with over 4,000 patients in the same year. Ex-patients of Riverview were often left without help or financial aid, which caused them to flock toward the Downtown Eastside of Vancouver.

Mark Smith, director of Triage, a shelter in Vancouver, stated that "there is zero available housing for these people—not even flop houses". He also said that much of the time, Riverview would try to discharge their patients right into the overnight shelter. He claimed that the mass discharges were turning the Downtown Eastside of Vancouver into a mental health ghetto. He additionally mentioned that many of his clients who had recently been discharged from Riverview (mostly schizophrenics) would commit suicide shortly after discharge, due to failure to properly medicate from lack of professional supervision.

Andrew Wan, a Kitsilano mental health worker, stated that in 1992, the conditions of privately run boarding homes are often no better than others. The places are run for profit, so they skim over expenses.

In 1994–95, expenditures on mental health services in BC were up by 34% over 1990–91. The BC government had invested the overdue money in the health care system.

In April 1996, the Vancouver Management Resource Group stated that the Vancouver Health Board was in the process of developing a budget based on the assumption that decreases in federal transfer payments would mean a status quo or reduced budget overall for 1996/1997".

Optimistically, the same 1996 report stated that due to numerous media reports about the crisis in the current system that suggested the downsizing of Riverview was leading to unacceptable pressure on the rest of the system, the Riverview Board recommended, and the ministry supported a stop to further downsizing of Riverview inpatient beds until the system stabilized.

In 2002, there were 800 beds at Riverview. The stakeholders' meeting stated that by 2007, there would be 920 specialized mental health beds located in smaller hospitals throughout British Columbia, but neither dates, places, nor names were given. No mention of sites opening in the city of Vancouver were mentioned, either.

Press releases by the Provincial Health Services Authority indicated that conditions had improved seven years later. In 2003, three new mental health facilities had opened in Prince George, Kamloops, and Victoria. Along with the new buildings, eighty patients from Riverview were discharged. They did not indicate whether beds had been implemented for the patients who had already been discharged prior to the construction of the three new buildings that were immediately filled with then-Riverview patients.

At the 2004 stakeholders' meeting, it was stated that there were 84 new beds in mental health housing facilities in British Columbia. From 2003 to 2004, four beds had been officially added. At the same meeting, it was stated that by 2007, over 400 newly developed mental health beds were to open in the Vancouver Coastal and Fraser Health Authorities, a 520-bed decrease from what was stated the previous year. At the same meeting, PHSA Mental Health Services President Leslie Arnold said, "A comprehensive transition care plan, including input from family members, is developed from each RVH patient prior to transfer'.

In 2013, then-mayor of Maple Ridge stated that he was concerned with the number of people with mental illness who were living on the street in the Lower Mainland. His council pushed to re-open Riverview Hospital to help solve the problem.

On September 20, 2013, the BC government rejected the recommendation of the Union of BC Mayors to re-instate Riverview Hospital. The reason the premier gave was that re-institutionalization is not the solution to homelessness or drug addiction. Instead, there is "a new set of problems we need to deal with...Gaps in the community health care system are what need to be addressed".

The building was altered for use in the 2014 film Godzilla and was still in modern hospital conditions at the time. Conservationists had hopes to save it so that it could be reopened, but demolition went ahead.

Demolition of the Valleyview building, one of the last buildings onsite to close, began in 2016.

References

External links

 Riverview Hospital clickable map and detailed building history

Hospital buildings completed in 1878
Hospital buildings completed in 1913
Government buildings completed in 1913
Buildings and structures in Coquitlam
Hospitals in British Columbia
Psychiatric hospitals in Canada
Hospitals established in 1913
Arboreta in Canada
Defunct hospitals in Canada
1878 establishments in British Columbia